When the Man Went South is a 2014 historical drama film written and directed by Alex Bernstein, set in Tonga during the pre-colonial era. It was the first feature film principally in the Tongan language.

Production

Filming took place in March–April 2013, mostly on the island of ʻEua, and also at Pangaimotu (Tongatapu) and the Hufangalupe natural arch. When the Man Went South was filmed in digital on a Canon EOS 5D Mark III and GoPro HERO3.

Synopsis
In 18th-century Tonga, a young man is sent out from his village in order to learn the skills that he will need as potential future chieftain.

Release
When the Man Went South had its world premiere on 3 March 2014 at Cinequest Film & Creativity Festival. It was nominated for several awards at the St Tropez International Film Festival.

References

External links
 

2014 drama films
Tongan films
Films set in Tonga
Films shot in Tonga
Age of Discovery films
Indigenous films